South Hams District Council is the local authority for the South Hams District in Devon, England. The council is elected every four years. Since the last boundary changes in 2015, 31 councillors have been elected from 20 wards: eleven of which elect one councillor, seven elect two councillors and two elect three councillors. Between 1999 and 2014, 40 councillors were elected from 30 wards.

Political control
The first election to the council was held in 1973, initially operating as a shadow authority before coming into its powers on 1 April 1974. Political control of the council since 1973 has been held by the following parties:

Leadership
The leaders of the council since 1994 have been:

Council elections
1973 South Hams District Council election 
1976 South Hams District Council election 
1979 South Hams District Council election  (New ward boundaries)
1983 South Hams District Council election 
1987 South Hams District Council election  (District boundary changes took place but the number of seats remained the same)
1991 South Hams District Council election
1995 South Hams District Council election
1999 South Hams District Council election  (New ward boundaries reduced the number of seats by 4)
2003 South Hams District Council election
2007 South Hams District Council election
2011 South Hams District Council election
2015 South Hams District Council election (New ward boundaries reduced the number of seats by 9)
2019 South Hams District Council election

District result maps

By-election results

1995-1999

1999-2003

2003-2007

2007-2011

2015-2019
Totnes is represented by three councillors. This by-election was called following the resignation of Green Party councillor Barrie Wood.

This by-election was called following the resignation of Conservative councillor Lindsay Ward

References

By-election results

External links
South Hams District Council

 
Council elections in Devon
District council elections in England